Niklas Meinert (born 1 May 1981 in Bad Kreuznach, Rhineland-Palatinate) is a field hockey midfielder from Germany, who played for Mannheimer HC. He made his international senior debut for the Men's National Team on 23 March 2003 in a friendly match against Pakistan in Ipoh, Malaysia. As of 23 March 2008, Meinert earned 109 caps for his native country, in which he scored 16 goals.

International senior tournaments
 2003 – Champions Trophy, Amstelveen (6th place)
 2004 – Champions Trophy, Lahore (5th place)
 2005 – European Nations Cup, Leipzig (3rd place)
 2005 – Champions Trophy, Chennai (4th place)
 2006 – 11th World Cup, Mönchengladbach (1st place)
 2007 – European Nations Cup, Manchester (4th place)
 2007 – Champions Trophy, Kuala Lumpur (1st place)

External links
 
 Profile on German Hockey Federation

1981 births
Living people
German male field hockey players
People from Bad Kreuznach
Olympic field hockey players of Germany
Field hockey players at the 2008 Summer Olympics
Olympic gold medalists for Germany
Olympic medalists in field hockey
Medalists at the 2008 Summer Olympics
Sportspeople from Rhineland-Palatinate
Mannheimer HC players
21st-century German people
2006 Men's Hockey World Cup players